Easy Allies (abbreviated as EZA) is an online video game website that includes news coverage, reviews, personality-driven gaming videos and short form comedic series, created by a group of former GameTrailers staff. Since acquiring their new studio, the group has been based out of Culver City, California. The website was found to be the 'Most Trusted Publication of 2016' by video game review aggregator OpenCritic.

History 
Following the shuttering of GameTrailers by owner Defy Media in February 2016, nine former full-time staff members, including GameTrailers co-founder and primary voice-over Brandon Jones, joined together to launch a new site that would allow the group "to do what we want to do". The new venture, Easy Allies, was launched on March 21, 2016. Operational costs are primarily met through crowdfunding on Patreon, with support from backers reaching $40,000 per month within three months of launch.

All trademarks and copyrights relevant to the GameTrailers brand remained property of Defy Media following GameTrailers closure. This meant that Easy Allies, though positioning itself as spiritual successor to GameTrailers, was unable to re-use the names of shows established while under the GameTrailers banner. This hurdle was acknowledged by Jones in an interview for Patreon in May 2016, with Jones commenting that their original pitch to backers was "you know the show, we're just going to change the title". The GameTrailers brand and all associated assets were purchased by IGN in May 2016.

In November 2017, several backers pulled their support from Easy Allies following an appearance by Jones on Fireside Chats, a series on YouTube hosted by former IGN journalist Colin Moriarty. Moriarty had faced criticism earlier that year over a post he made on social network Twitter that many had perceived to be sexist.

As of 2018, reaching a set goal of $50,000 per month on the crowdfunding site Patreon, they acquired a studio. Easy Allies moved production to the studio one month later on January 29, 2019. In March 2020, Kyle Bosman announced that he would be leaving the company.

On March 21, 2022, the sixth anniversary of Easy Allies launch, Jones announced he would be retiring from Easy Allies and video game journalism the following May, although he will continue to provide voiceovers for some of their video content. The company also stated on Patreon that fellow co-founders Isla Hinck and Daniel Bloodworth had been named co-heads of Easy Allies two months prior to create a more solidified company structure. On June 21, Ben Moore announced his departure from Easy Allies.

Current operations
Easy Allies operates out of California, United States. In addition to publishing video game reviews, Easy Allies has produced (among other things) podcasts focusing on video games and movies, an investigatory series on video game myths, a weekly Dungeons & Dragons role-playing show, and an animated web series starring voice artist Amanda Troop. Easy Allies also regularly livestream video games on Twitch, and has utilised this to solicit donations for charity from their fans, helping raise over $12,000 for The AbleGamers Foundation in July 2018.

Easy Allies has served as a voting jury member for The Game Awards since 2017, and participated as a judge for the 2018 and 2019 Game Critics Awards.

Notable guests
Australian actor Luke Arnold has appeared on Huber Syndrome, a weekly show about video games, movies, television and comic books, to discuss his role as John Silver in American historical adventure television series Black Sails. Arnold later guest starred in the Easy Allies animated series Box Peek. Cory Barlog, director of Santa Monica Studio's video game God of War, appeared on an episode of Spoiler Mode in April 2018 to speak about the then recently released title.

Games of the Year
The list below solely mentions Easy Alliess yearly choices for Best Game of the Year. There are also other multiple categories chosen yearly such as Best World Design, Best Soundtrack, and a unique category called "Best Seven" referring to games that the staff believed didn't live up to expected hype but were good regardless.

References

External links 
 

Internet properties established in 2016
Video game Internet forums
2016 establishments in California
Video game news websites
Patreon creators